When I'm Free is the seventh studio album by Norwegian singer-songwriter Ane Brun. The album was released in 2015 with both a Standard Edition (10 tracks) and a Deluxe Edition (12 tracks).

Track listing
All songs written by Ane Brun, except where noted.
 "Hanging" – 5:37
 "Black Notebook" – 3:57
 "You Lit My Fire" – 4:57
 "Directions" – 3:15
 "Shape of a Heart" – 3:40
 "Miss You More" – 3:36
 "All We Want Is Love" – 4:23
 "Still Waters" – 5:25
 "Better Than This" – 5:34
 "Signing Off" – 5:29
Bonus tracks on digital deluxe version
<li>"Let in Your Love" – 4:20
<li>"Hunting High and Low" (Paul Waaktaar-Savoy) – 3:43

Personnel

Ane Brun – vocals, backing vocals, acoustic guitar
Dan Berglund – double bass on tracks 1, 4 and 9
Sabina Ddumba – guest vocals on track 3
John Eriksson – mallets/sounds on track 2; synth pads and synth bass outro on track 9
Tobias Fröberg – cymbals on track 4; drum programming on tracks 1, 3 and 9; hi-hat on track 9; percussion programming on track 5; string machine on track 6; strings on tracks 1 and 7
Thobias Gabrielsson – bass on tracks 3, 5 and 6
Mikael Häggström – percussion on track 3
Martin Hederos – keyboards on tracks 1, 3, 4, 5, 6, 8, 9 and 10
Ola Hultgren – drums on tracks 3, 5 and 6; percussion on tracks 4 and 5
Nina Kinert – backing vocals on track 3
Johan Lindström – electric guitars on track 10; pedal steel guitar on tracks 2, 6, 8 and 9
Linnea Olsson – backing vocals on tracks 3 and 6
Lars Skoglund – drums on tracks 1, 2, 8 and 9; hi-hat on track 3
Andreas Werlin – drums on tracks 3, 4 and 5; percussion on track 5

Strings on tracks 1 and 7
Joakim Milder – conductor and string arrangements
Violins: Torbjörn Bernhardsson, Ulf Forsberg, Hanna Göran, Iskander Komilov, Annette Mannheimer, Veronika Novotna, Bo Söderström
Violas: Elisabeth Arnberg, Ingegerd Kierkegaard, Svein H. Martinsen, Ann Christin Wingård Ward
Cellos: Jana Boutani, Helena Nilsson

Production
Ane Brun – producer
Tobias Fröberg – producer
Johannes Berglund – additional production

Charts

References

2015 albums
Ane Brun albums